Dead of Winter is a 2015 young adult fantasy novel written by Kresley Cole. It is the third part of The Arcana Chronicles series. The main theme of the novel is the love triangle between a group of teens possessing tarot-themed powers: Jack, Evie and Death.

References

2015 American novels
Young adult fantasy novels
Simon & Schuster books